Cymindis tschikatunovi is a species of ground beetle in the subfamily Harpalinae. It is commonly found in the UK. It was described by Mikhailov in 1977.

References

tschikatunovi
Beetles described in 1977